Vasyl Ivanovych Poraiko (Ukrainian: Василь Іванович Порайко; 12 October 1888, Ustea, now in Kolomyia Raion, Ivano-Frankivsk, Ukraine - 25 October 1937) was a Ukrainian Soviet statesman and lawyer.

Biography 
He studied at Chernivtsi University and Lviv University, graduating in 1914. On the outbreak of World War I he was recruited into the Austro-Hungarian Army, but was captured by the Russians in 1915. He supported the October Revolution of 1917 and in 1919 was sent to Ukraine, where he took part in the foundation of the Ukrainian SSR, acting as its second Prosecutor General from 1927 to 1930 and People's Commissar of Justice.

He was arrested by the NKVD charges of participation in the "bourgeois-nationalist anti-Soviet organization of the former Borotbists " and "the Ukrainian Military Organisation". He was shot in October, 1937 and posthumously rehabilitated in 1957.

References

Sources
http://ruthenia.info/txt/vidrodzhenia/dumynetsi/

1888 births
1937 deaths
People from Ivano-Frankivsk Oblast
People from the Kingdom of Galicia and Lodomeria
Ukrainian Austro-Hungarians
World War I prisoners of war held by Russia
Austro-Hungarian prisoners of war in World War I
Red Ukrainian Galician Army people
Ukrainian politicians
General Prosecutors of Ukraine
Members of the All-Ukrainian Central Executive Committee
Central Committee of the Communist Party of Ukraine (Soviet Union) members
Great Purge victims from Ukraine
Soviet  lawyers